Operation Dawn-10 or Walfajr-10 (Persian: عملیات والفجر ۱۰) was an operation which was launched during Iran–Iraq War by Iran against Iraq on March 15 1988. During Operation Dawn-10, Iran changed its operational area from southern to northern Iraq. The operation was started with the code of "Ya Rasūl Allāh (s)" (Persian: (یا رسول الله (ص) (likewise "Ya Muhammad ibn Abdullah"), and performed in 5 steps.

Operation Dawn-10 was executed on the west heights overlooking Darbandikhan lake in the Sulaymaniyah Governorate in Iraq. The siege led to the capture of 3 towns and around 100 villages in the 1200 square kilometer operational area, including Halabja, Kharmal, Biareh, and Tawileh. Additionally, the town of Nosud in Iran was retaken from Iraqi forces. According to Iranian newspapers, they claimed that the operation resulted in the death or injury of roughly 10,000 Iraqi forces, and the capture of 5440 more.

See also 
 Operation Beit ol-Moqaddas 4

References 

Iran–Iraq War
1988 in Iran
1988 in Iraq
Military operations of the Iran–Iraq War
Military operations of the Iran–Iraq War in 1988